Charles Ingabire (died 30 November 2011) was a Rwandan journalist and the editor of the Kinyarwanda-language news website Inyenyeri News.

Prior to 2007, Ingabire was the editor of the Kigali-based newspaper Umuco.  From 2007 to 2011 he lived in Kampala, Uganda and was an outspoken critic of the Rwandan government.  On 30 November 2011 he was shot dead at a Kampala pub.

See also
 Jean-Léonard Rugambage
 André Kagwa Rwisereka
 Théogène Turatsinze

References 

2011 deaths
Deaths by firearm in Uganda
People murdered in Uganda
Rwandan expatriates in Uganda
20th-century births
Year of birth missing
Assassinated dissidents
Assassinated Rwandan journalists